A darknet is a network that can only be accessed with specific software, configurations, or authorization.

Darknet or dark net may also refer to:
 Dark web, the part of the World Wide Web which exists only in darknets
 Network telescope, or darknet, used to monitor network traffic on unallocated IP space
 Darknet (TV series), a 2013 Canadian horror television series
 Dark Net (TV series), a 2016 American documentary television series
 Darknet, a fictional plot device in Daniel Suarez's Daemon novels
 Darknet, an American nu metalcore band
 The Dark Net: Inside the Digital Underworld, 2014 book by Jamie Bartlett
 Operation Darknet, a campaign by the hacktivist group Anonymous

ca:Darknet
de:Darknet
es:Darknet
fr:Darknet
it:Darknet
pt:Darknet
sv:Darknet